Cladanthus is a genus of plants in the  sunflower family, native to the Mediterranean region.

 Species
 Cladanthus arabicus (L.) Cass. -SoutheasternSpain, Western Sahara, Morocco, Algeria, Libya, Tunisia, Malta, Sicily
 Cladanthus eriolepis (Coss. ex Maire) Oberpr. & Vogt- Morocco
 Cladanthus flahaultii (Emb.) Oberpr. & Vogt- Morocco
 Cladanthus mixtus (L.) Chevall. - Portugal, Spain, Italy, Albania, Greece, France, Channel Islands (UK), Malta, Algeria, Morocco, Egypt, Libya, Tunisia, Azores, Madeira, Canary Islands, Turkey, Syria, Lebanon, Palestine, Israel, Jordan
 Cladanthus scariosus (Ball) Oberpr. & Vogt - Morocco

References

External links

 SysTax: Cladanthus

Anthemideae
Asteraceae genera